John Francis Bregar (born March 1, 1985) is a Canadian actor best known for his role as Dylan Michalchuk on Degrassi: The Next Generation. He also played Cody Flowers in Family Biz.

His professional acting debut was starring in the music video "Father" by Knights of the Realm. He played Jason Valentine in the Canadian Film Center short film, Todd And The Book Of Pure Evil. He and Adamo Ruggiero were nominated for a GLAAD Media Award at the 15th Annual GLAAD Media Awards and featured in The Advocate for their roles in Degrassi: The Next Generation as Dylan Michalchuk and Marco Del Rossi.

Other work
Bregar also played Bobby Clarke in the made-for-TV movie Canada Russia '72.

Bregar also played Cody in the lifetime movie Dead At 17 (2008).

Bregar starred the film Verona with fellow Degrassi star Shannon Kook. The film was released in winter 2012 by Canadian Filmmakers Distribution Centre.

In 2009 Bregar portrayed the role of Scott Mink in CBS's show Flashpoint, along with Calum Worthy and Alexia Fast.  He also portrayed an FBI agent in CBS's The Mentalist, in the episode "Red John", which aired on November 24, 2013.

Bregar guest starred in an episode of Murdoch Mysteries that aired March 18, 2013, playing a character named Alvin Storey.  He appeared in an episode of Saving Hope that aired November 26, 2015, playing a husband of a pregnant woman in the hospital.  Bregar also played a character named Trent Harris in two episodes of the third season in the US version of the supernatural TV show Being Human as a human and then a ghost after accidentally being killed by one of the leading characters.

Filmography

Film

Television

References

External links
John Bregar's official website via web.archive.org

1985 births
Living people
Canadian male television actors
Canadian male film actors
Canadian male child actors
Male actors from Toronto
People from North York